The Lagan Valley (Ulster Scots: Glen Lagan) is an area of Northern Ireland between Belfast and Lisburn. The River Lagan rises on Slieve Croob in County Down and flows generally northward discharging into Belfast Lough. For a section, the river forms part of the border between the counties of Antrim and Down.

The towpath which runs alongside the River between Lisburn and Belfast is popular with walkers, runners, cyclists, dog owners etc. It is a very scenic and peaceful area and is ideal for walking, cycling etc. As a cycle route the towpath forms part of National Cycle Route 9. There are a number of "off route" mountain bike trails along the route.

The Lagan Valley is an Area of Outstanding Natural Beauty (AONB). The AONB was established in 1965 and the greater part of it lies within the Greater Belfast area.

Political constituency
The Lagan Valley is also the name of a constituency in the House of Commons covering Lisburn and surrounding areas, as well as the Assembly constituency in the same area. There are approximately 242 townlands in the constituency area.

The UK parliamentary constituency has been a Unionist stronghold. The current MP for the constituency is Jeffrey Donaldson of the Democratic Unionist Party who was first elected as an Ulster Unionist Party candidate in 1997, retaining the seat in 2001. Following his defection to the DUP, he retained the seat in 2005.

References 

Areas of Outstanding Natural Beauty in Northern Ireland
Valleys of Northern Ireland
Protected areas established in 1965
Protected areas of County Antrim